The SFera Award is awarded annually by the science fiction society SFera in Zagreb since 1981. Until 1991, it was given to participants from whole of Yugoslavia, but since 1994 only for works originally published in Croatian.

The SFera award is given to the best accomplishments in science fiction (as well as in fantasy and horror genre) first published or shown in Croatia over the preceding year.

At the beginning, the award was only for literary works, but with time, expanded to many categories. Currently it is awarded in the following categories:

miniature (very short story)
short story 
story 
novella 
novel 
novel for children
drama
poetry
color illustrations
black-white illustrations
comic book

Other mediums (costimography, sculpture, film, video, music) are designated as "special achievements". It is also awarded for life's work and from time to time, a special award for newcomers, called Protosfera.

Winners

1981 
Story: Goran Hudec, Prsten
Novel: Miha Remec, Prepoznavanje (slovenski author)
Dedication: emisija Eppur si muove Radio Zagreb

1982 
Story: Radovan Devlić, Hajka
Life work: Zvonimir Furtinger
Dedication: Dušan Vukotić

1983 
Story: Biljana Mateljan, Vrijeme je, maestro
Dedication: Sirius magazine

1984 
Story: Slobodan Čurčić, Šume, kiše, grad i zvezde (srpski author)
Novel: Branko Belan, Utov dnevnik
Dediacation: IRO Politika (Belgrade) and Brane Dimitrović

1985 
Story: Hrvoje Prćić, Ana s onu stranu zrcala
Comic book: Željko Pahek
Dedication: Galerija Studentskog centra u Zagrebu, Boban Knežević i Talijanski kulturni centar u Zagrebu

1986 
Priča: Slobodan Petrovski, Most
Roman: Predrag Raos, Mnogo vike nizašto
Dedication: Centar za kulturu Pešćenica, Technical Museum in Zagreb, Borivoj Jurković

1987 
Story: Miha Remec, Spomenik Euridiki (slovenski author)
Comic book: Igor Kordej
Dedication: Žiga Leskovšek, IRO Prosveta (Beograd)

1988 
Story: Vladimir Lazović, Sokolar 
Dedication: Dobrosav Bob Živković

1989 
Story: Predrag Raos, Škorpion na jeziku
Life's work: Gavrilo Vučković (srpski urednik)

1990 
Story: Radovan Devlić, Zatvor
Novel: Radivoje Lola Đukić, Ovca na Bulevaru Oktobarske revolucije (srpski author)

1991 
Priča: Vera Ivosić-Santo, Evici, s ljubavlju
Roman: Predrag Raos, Nul effort
Posebno ostvarenje: Zoran Živković, Enciklopedija naučne fantastike (srpski teoretičar)

1992 
Not awarded.

1993 
Not awarded.

1994 
Story: Darko Macan, Mihovil Škotska Snježnica
Illustration: Aleksandar Žiljak

1995 

Short story: Darko Macan, Pročitaj i daj dalje
Story: Jasmina Blažić, Kuća na broju 15
Novella: Jasmina Gluhak, Nataša Pavlović, One Shot
Illustration: Igor Kordej

1996 

Short story: Mario Berečić, Ovo je moja nesreća
Story: Tatjana Jambrišak, Duh novog svijeta
Drama: Hrvoje Kovačević, Profesionalna deformacija
Color illustration: Igor Kordej
Black-white illustration: Aleksandar Žiljak
Life's work: Krsto A. Mažuranić i Ivica Posavec
Protosfera: Zvjezdana Odobašić, for novel Čudesna krljušt

1997 

Miniature: Denis Peričić, Diptih o doktoru
Short story: Dean Fabić, Svi njihovi životi
Story: Aleksandar Žiljak, Slijepe ptice
Novel: Predrag Raos, Od rata do zvijezda
Color illustration: Karlo Galeta
Black-white illustration: Tihomir Tikulin
Special achievement: Urban & 4, for the album Otrovna kiša

1998 

Miniature: Zdenko Vlainić, Buba
Short story: Tatjana Jambrišak, Crveno i crno
Story: Goran Konvični, Pet minuta do budućnosti
Drama: Marijana Nola, Don Huanov kraj
Illustration: Bojan Tarticchio
Životno djelo: Zdravko Valjak
Protosfera: Andrija Jakić, za priču a.n.d.

1999 

Miniature: Aleksandar Žiljak, Prvi let
Short story: Jasmina Blažić, Kraj stoljeća
Story: Zoran Pongrašić, Dijagonala
Drama: Denis Peričić, Netopir
Novel: Milena Benini Getz, Kaos
Color illustration: Željko Pahek
Crno-bijela ilustracija: Esad T. Ribić
Životno djelo: Damir Mikuličić

2000 

Miniature: Zoran Vlahović, Lovci slave
Short story: Irena Krčelić, Gubilište
Story: Krešimir Mišak, Svijet iduće sekunde
Novella: Dalibor Perković, Banijska praskozorja
Drama: Ivana Sajko, Idući površinom
Illustration: Goran Šarlija

2001 

Miniature: Aleksandar Žiljak, Hladni dodir vatre 
Short story: Igor Lepčin, Blijedonarančasta Tineluss
Story: Vanja Spirin, Nimfa
Novela: Krunoslav Gernhard, Libra mrtvieh nazivja
Roman: Darko Macan, Koža boje masline
Esej: Igor Marković, U vrtlogu stvarnosti - Dick čitan Flusserom
Ilustracija: Robert Drozd
Životno djelo: Živko Prodanović
Posebni doprinos SFERAKONU 2000: Tajana Štasni
Protosfera: Marin Medić, za priču Trkač

2002 

Miniature: Kristijan Novak, Posljednjih sedam milisekundi
Short story: Viktoria Faust, Teško je biti vampir
Story: Želimir Periš, Tisućljeće
Novela: Igor Lepčin, Nebo iznad Marijane
Crno-bijela ilustracija: Davor Rapaić (za knjigu 'Neusporediva' protiv slučajne sličnosti)
Ilustracija u boji: Tatjana Jambrišak (za www.tatjana.ws )
Povelja: Bojan Krstić (for the magazine Futura)

2003 
Miniature: Zoran Krušvar, Igra
Short story: Marina Jadrejčić, Tužna madona
Story: Tatjana Jambrišak, Ima li bolje zabave, moje dame?
Roman za djecu: Darko Macan, Pavo protiv Pave
Roman: Dejan Šorak, Ja i Kalisto
Crno-bijela ilustracija: Filip Cerovečki (Lovecraftova galerija)
Ilustracija u boji: Štef Bartolić (naslovnica Monolitha)
Povelja: Dvotjedniku Zarezu za prilog o Philipu Kindredu Dicku

2004 

Miniature: Zoran Krušvar, Brodovi u tami 
Short story: Viktoria Faust, Vrištač 
Story: Danilo Brozović, Prsti 
Novela: Dalibor Perković, Preko rijeke
Roman za djecu: Zvonko Todorovski, Prozor zelenog bljeska 
Roman: Ivan Gavran, Sablja 
Ilustracija: Milivoj Ćeran, za Vile hrvatskih pisaca
Protosfera: Jurica Palijan, Bili ste divna publika 
Povelja: elektronski fanzin NOSF

2005 

Miniature: Saša Škerla, Bilo jednom
Short story: Bojan Sudarević, Cyberfolk 
Story: Krešimir Mišak, Akvarij sa zlatnim ribicama 
Novela: Zoran Pongrašić, Letač
Roman: Oliver Franić, Araton
Ilustracija: Darko Vučenik (za naslovnicu knjige Čuvari sreće Z. Pongrašića)
Posebna priznanja: Vlatko Jurić-Kokić, Davor Šišović

2006 

Miniature: Zoran Janjanin, Primarna zdravstvena...
Short story: Petra Bulić, Antarktički vjetar
Story: Danilo Brozović, Anne Droid
Novela: Milena Benini, McGuffin Link 
Roman: Dalibor Perković, Sva krv čovječanstva
Ilustracija: Tomislav Tomić (za naslovnicu knjige Zeleno sunce, crna spora D. Brozovića)

2007 
Miniature: Dario Rukavina, Ima li piljaka tamo gore, na jugu? (zbirka Blog.SF)
Short story: Viktoria Faust, Riana u sutonu sivom (zbirka Vampirske priče)
Story: Danijel Bogdanović, 87. kilometar (zbirka Zagrob)
Roman: Veselin Gatalo, Geto
Ilustracija: Nela Dunato, You don’t own me (naslovnica časopisa NOSF)
Posebno ostvarenje: Tomislav Šakić i Aleksandar Žiljak, Ad Astra – Antologija hrvatske znanstveno-fantastične novele 1976-2006
Životno djelo – Mladen Bjažić

2008 
 Miniature: Danijel Bogdanović, Decimala ("Krivo stvoreni", Pučko otvoreno učilište Pazin, 2007)
 Short story: Ivana D. Horvatinčić, Post mortem ("Priče o starim bogovima", Pučko otvoreno učilište Pazin, 2007)
 Story: Nikola Kuprešanin, Karakuri ningyo (NOSF magazin br. 25, 2007)
 Novela: Danilo Brozović, Besmrtna Diana ("Trinaesti krug bezdana", Mentor i SFera, 2007) 
 Roman: Predrag Raos, Let Nancija Konratata (Izvori, 2007)
 Roman za djecu: Darko Macan, Dlakovuk (Knjiga u centru, 2007)
 Esej: Zoran Kravar, Duboka fikcija - J. R. R. Tolkien (Ubiq br.1, Mentor, 2007)
 Zbirka poezije: Tatjana Jambrišak, Slova iz snova (Mentor, 2007)
 Posebno ostvarenje: Zoran Krušvar, Multimedijalni projekt Izvršitelji nauma Gospodnjeg Strip: Ivan Marušić, Entropola (Mentor, 2007)
 Posebno ostvarenje za oblikovanje časospisa Ubiq: Melina Mikulić 
 Protosfera: Vesna Bolfek, Snijeg i pepeo ("Priče o starim bogovima", Pučko otvoreno učilište Pazin, 2007)

 2009 

 Najbolja minijatura: Ed Barol, Zadnja vožnja (Dobar ulov, Pučko otvoreno učilište, Pazin, 2008)
 Najbolja priča: Dario Rukavina, Nek' se ne zna traga, Ljeljo! (Zlatni zmajev svitak, SFera & Mentor, 2008, Zagreb)
 Najbolja novela: Zoran Krušvar, Tako mora biti (Ubiq 3, Mentor, 2008, Zagreb)
 Najbolji roman: Sanshal Tamoya, Dobitnik (Slovo, 2008, Zagreb)
 Najbolji roman za djecu: Igor Lepčin, Vražje oko (Knjiga u centru, 2008, Zagreb)
 Najbolja ilustracija u boji: Biljana Mateljan, ilustracija naslovnice zbirke Zlatni zmajev svitak (SFera & Mentor, 2008, Zagreb)
 Najbolja crno-bijela ilustracija: Frano Petruša, ilustracije i knjizi Zvijeri plišane Zorana Krušvara (Knjiga u centru, 2008, Zagreb)
 Najbolji esej o žanru: dr. Nikica Gilić, Filmska fantastika i SF u kontekstu teorije žanra (Ubiq 2, Mentor, 2008, Zagreb)
 Životno djelo: dr. Darko Suvin, professor emeritus
 Protosfera: posebna nagrada za autora mlađeg od 21 godine, dobila je u kategoriji priče Valentina Mišković za priču Izgubljeni bijeli brat (Eridan 7, Treći zmaj, 2008, Rijeka)

 2010 
 Najbolja minijatura: Zoran Janjanin, Quare desperamus? (Treća stvarnost, Pučko otvoreno učilište, Pazin, 2009)
 Najbolja kratka priča: Milena Benini, Plesati zajedno pod polariziranim nebom (Priče o dinosaurima, Pučko otvoreno učilište, Pazin, 2009)
 Najbolja priča: Zoran Vlahović, Svaki put kad se rastajemo … (Ubiq 5, Mentor, Zagreb, 2009)
 Najbolji roman: Damir Hoyka, Xavia (VBZ, Zagreb, 2009)
 Najbolji roman za djecu: Ivana D. Horvatinčić, Pegazari (Knjiga u centru, Zagreb, 2009)
 Najbolja drama: Tanja Radović, zbirka drama Ledeno doba (Meandar, Zagreb, 2009)
 Najbolja ilustracija u boji: Tomislav Tikulin, ilustracija naslovnice Staklene knjige kradljivaca snova Gordona Dahlquista (Algoritam, Zagreb, 2009)

 2011 
 Minijatura – Ed Barol Avangarda (Dimenzija tajne, Pučko otvoreno učilište, Pazin, 2010)
 Kratka priča – Sanja Tenjer, Kao iz pera Arbine bake (Priče o zvijezdama, Pučko otvoreno učilište, Pazin, 2010.)
 Priča – Katarina Brbora, Starozavjetna (Ubiq 6, Mentor, 2010, Zagreb)
 Novela – Danijel Bodganović, Sjećaš li se zečića na Suncu? (Ubiq 7, Mentor, 2010, Zagreb)
 Roman – Marko Mihalinec & Velimir Grgić, Kriza (Algoritam, 2010., Zagreb)
 Esej – Zoran Kravar, Kad je svijet bio mlad:visoka fantastika i doktrinarni antimodernizam, Mentor, 2010. Zagreb 
 Crnobijela ilustracija – Zdenko Bašić, za ilustracije u romanu Luna (Algoritam, 2010, Zagreb)
 Ilustracija u boji – Marko Horvatrin, ilustracija naslovnice fanzina Eridan broj 9 (Treći zmaj, 2010, Rijeka)

 2012 
 Kratka priča – Aleksandar Žiljak, Lesija, u daljini Heraklovi stupovi (Turističke priče, Pučko otvoreno učilište, Pazin, 2011)
 Priča – Igor Rendić, Jednom, negdje (Ubiq 9, Mentor, 2011, Zagreb)
 Roman – Franjo Janeš, Formula za kaos (Algoritam, 2011, Zagreb)
 Roman za djecu – Darko Macan Djed Mrz (Knjiga u centru, 2011, Zagreb)
 Esej – Milena Benini, Divide et morere, (Književna republika 10-12, 2011, Zagreb)
 Ilustracija u boji – Zdenko Bašić, ilustracije u izdanju Sjeverozapadni vjetar, (Planetopija, 2011, Zagreb)
 Posebna kategorija: Časopis Književna republika za temat o Darku Suvinu
 Životno ostvarenje: Želimir Košćević
 Protosfera: Antonija Mežnarić, Svakoj priči jednom mora doći kraj (Laboratorij Fantastike 2, 2011, Rijeka)

 2013 

 Roman - Aleksandar Žiljak, Irbis Kratka priča - Aleksandar Žiljak, Srneći but s lisičicama, uz njega teran iz zbirke Priče o vinu
 Minijatura - Vesna Kurilić, Priča supružnika Priča - David Kelečić, Imago ultima Roman za djecu - Norma Šerment-Mikulčić Adrijanin vrt Teorijski rad - Petra Mrduljaš, djelo Prstenovi koji se šire: Junačka potraga u djelima J. R. R. Tolkiena
 Crno-bijela ilustracija - Korina Hunjak, Loki, objavljena u fanzinu Eridan
 Ilustracija u boji - Mario Rosanda, naslovnica zbirke Priče o vinu 

 2014 

 Minijatura – David Kelečić, Dječak i mora 
 Kratka priča – Irena Hartmann, Lutke 
 Roman – Tomica Šćavina, Povratak genija Roman za djecu – Nataša Govedić, Mrežir, zemlja mačaka i zmajeva Teorija – Rafaela Božić, Distopija i jezik: distopijski roman kroz oko lingvostilistike Posebno ostvarenje - Predrag Ličina, Teleport Zovko'',  kratki film

See also
SFeraKon

References

Awards established in 1981
Science fiction awards
Comics awards
1981 establishments in Yugoslavia
Croatian science fiction
Speculative fiction awards